Parapoynx nivalis is a species of moth in the family Crambidae. It is found in Germany, Poland, the Czech Republic, Austria, Slovakia, Hungary, Bosnia and Herzegovina, Bulgaria, Romania, Ukraine and Russia.

References

Moths described in 1775
Acentropinae
Moths of Europe